"September Song" is an American pop standard, originally performed in Knickerbocker Holiday (1938).

September Song may also refer to:

 September Song (album), a 1963 album by Jimmy Durante
 "September Song" (JP Cooper song), 2016
 September Song (TV series), a British television comedy-drama
 September (Earth, Wind & Fire song), a song by Earth, Wind & Fire (1978)

See also
 September Songs – The Music of Kurt Weill, a 1994 documentary
 "September" (song), multiple songs with this title